Olla gitana is a Spanish stew from Andalusia.

See also
Andalusian cuisine

References

Andalusian cuisine
Spanish cuisine
Romani cuisine